Barry Stowe (born November 1957) is an American business executive. He held senior positions at leading insurance companies, including Prudential plc and American International Group (AIG).

Early life and education

Barry Lee Stowe was born in November 1957, a seventh-generation Nashvillian.

He is a graduate of Lipscomb Academy, and Lipscomb University, where he received a bachelor of arts in politics and classical studies in 1979. Stowe was named as Lipscomb’s alumnus of the year in 2009, and in 2014, the College of Business dedicated an auditorium in his honor.

Career
In 1980, following Stowe’s graduation from Lipscomb, he joined Corroon & Black, a Nashville-based insurance firm that later merged with Willis Faber to form Willis Corroon Group. In 1992 he joined Nisus, a subsidiary of Pan-American life, and was ultimately appointed its president and CEO.

In 1995, Stowe joined AIG where he held several senior positions, including being president of AIG Life Companies Accident & Health Worldwide, a Hong Kong-based business unit that generated over $2 billion of earnings in 2005.

Prudential

In 2006 Stowe joined the global insurer Prudential plc as chief executive officer of Prudential Corporation Asia, a subsidiary operating in 14 markets in Asia. During his tenure he led a transformation resulting in a material increase in profitability. In June 2015, after 20 years of experience in global markets, he returned to Nashville after being named chairman and CEO of Prudential's North American businesses, including Jackson National Life and its affiliates, National Planning Holdings, and the institutional asset manager PPM America. In 2018, he announced his retirement. Stowe was a member of the board of directors and the group executive committee of Prudential plc from October 2006 to December 2018. He still acts as a senior advisor for the group.

Boards and committees

In April 2019, Stowe was appointed as a member of the board of directors of Zurich Insurance Group, one of the world’s largest insurers. He is a member of the Sons of the American Revolution, and the %30 Club.

He previously served on the boards of Life Office Management Association (LOMA), American Council of Life Insurers (ACLI), and other organizations. He was the chairman of Save the Children. He was a trustee of the Hong Kong International School and Harpeth Hall School in Nashville. He Chairs the Board of Trustees of {(Cheekwood Botanical Garden and Museum)}

Personal life
Barry Stowe is married to Sherri Stewart Stowe, they have three daughters.

References

External links
Official biography on Jackson National

1957 births
Living people
People from Nashville, Tennessee
Lipscomb University alumni
Businesspeople from Tennessee
American chief executives
American chief executives of financial services companies